Aso caldera (also known as Asosan, the Aso Volcano or Mount Aso, although the later term usually is used related to its currently active vents) is a geographical feature of Kumamoto Prefecture, Japan. It stretches 25 kilometers north to south and 18 kilometers east to west. The central core "Aso Gogaku" is the five major mountains in the area. Aso valley (Asodani) runs along the northern base of Mount Aso and Nango valley (Nangodani) along the south. According to research of caldera sediment, lakes used to exist in these valleys. The dried up lake areas have come to be called Old Aso Lake, Kugino Lake, and Aso Valley Lake. The Kikuchi, Shirakawa and Kurokawa rivers now drain the caldera.

Geology 
Within the caldera are more than 17 cones. Other volcanic features include Kishimadake (Mount Kishima), Kusasenrigahama, Komezuka, a scoria cone, Ikenokubo maar, a tuff ring and Takanooban, a lava dome. Magma migrates diagonally upward from approximately  depth through a northward-dipping magma-filled crack propagation zone, then into the shallow magma reservoirs mentioned already and during eruptions into an upright crack intrusion zone at  depth. There are many geothermal areas including centrally the Jigoku or "hell" Onsen and Tarutama hot springs and in the northern part, the Uchinomaki hot springs.

Formation 

The caldera formed from four major pyroclastic flow events which occurred between 90,000 and 270,000 years ago. The largest of these was the fourth, which reached as far as nearby Yamaguchi Prefecture 160 kilometers away. The fourth eruption left a massive pyroclastic plateau which is what remains even today. In 1985 it was discovered that volcanic ash from the fourth eruption covered much of the Japanese islands. The eruptive volume of the fourth eruption is estimated to be  dense-rock equivalent (DRE).

Eruptions 

Aso volcano has been active at intervals of approximately 10–20 years with the most active cone in recorded history being Nakadake located in the center of the caldera. It has been active since the sixth century. Eruptions occurred from November 2014 to May 2015, with two major phreatomagmatic eruptions on September 14, 2015, and October 8, 2016. Eruptive activity occurred on 20 October 2021.

Main eruption ages and eruption volume (DRE (dense-rock equivalent) is the equivalent magma eruption volume. The volume of erupted products is much higher):
 Aso-1: About 266,000 years ago, erupted  DRE.
 Aso-2: About 141,000 years ago, erupted  DRE.
 Aso-3: About 130,000 years ago, erupted  DRE.
 Aso-4: About 90,000 years ago, erupted  DRE  which was at least VEI 7.
 Nojiri pumice about 84,000 years ago erupted  DRE.
 Kusasenrigahama Pumice from Kusasenrigahama at approximately 30,000 years ago erupted  DRE at VEI 5
 Jigoku spa about 8,050 BCE, Ikph2 tephra
 Janoo before 5,300 BCE Tephta and scora cone
 Nakadake 5,300 to 12,000 BCE tephra falls
 near Janoo about 5,300 BCE Akamizu lava flow
 Near Ikenokubo about 5,300 BCE tuff ring
 Jigoku Onsen 3,000 to 4,400 BCE tephra, Ikph1 tephra
 Nakadake 3,000 to 4,400 BCE tephra falls
 Nakadake 4,000 to 3,000 BCE tephra falls
 Unknown vent near Janoo, 2150 BCE Aso central cone No. 1 pumice, ACP-1 tephra
 Kishimadake 2,050 BCE > DME VEI 4, KsS tephra
 Nakadake 1,600 to 2,000 BCE tephra falls
 Ojodake 1,650 BCE > DME VEI 4, OjS tephra
 Komezuka, Kamikomezuka 1,350 BCE tephra  DME
 Unknown Aso 1270 ± 75 BCE
 Western central cones debris avalanche 100 CE to 400 BCE
 Nakadake 630 ± 50 BCE tephra falls
 Nakadake 440 ± 75 CE N2S tephra fall
 See timeline for eruptions in historic written record (KEY-pink if confined to volcano, red tephra fall, magenta human deaths)

Tectonics 
There are multiple active faults both under the volcano and adjacent on this area of the Amur Plate. The Okinawa Plate collides with the Amur Plate to the south and the Pacific Plate is subducting under both. The caldera is located where two volcanic lines intersect, being those in the Central Kyushu Rift Valley with volcanoes of Mount Yufu, in Oita Prefecture, through the Kuju volcanoes and Aso Caldera, and on to Mount Unzen and line that runs from Aso Caldera to the Kirishima volcanic group, Aira Caldera, Ata Caldera, and on to the Kikai Caldera. The high resolution Bouguer gravity imaging of Kyushu has confirmed the caldera to be piston rather than funnel shaped, as originally proposed, and related to known active faults and in particular the gravity gradient zone of the Aso Caldera is part of the Oita-Kumamoto Tectonic Line (OKTL) gravity gradient zone and this appears to connect with the Japan Median Tectonic Lines gravity gradient zone, strengthening the evidence that the lines are closely related tectonic features.

Size and other context 

Furthermore, in Japan, the caldera forming Lake Kussharo, which measures {, is larger than Aso caldera leaving it the second largest in Japan. It's not rare to see calderas of this scale; however, to see calderas with an interior stable enough to cultivate land, build highways and lay railroads is quite rare. The caldera contains the city of Aso as well as the town and village of Takamori and Minamiaso.

External links 
 Asosan – Japan Meteorological Agency 
 Asosan: National catalogue of the active volcanoes in Japan – Japan Meteorological Agency volcanic data
 Aso Volcano – Geological Survey of Japan – maps
 Aso Caldera – Geological Survey of Japan – volcano data
 
 Aso Geopark

References 

Calderas of Kyushu
Pleistocene calderas
Active volcanoes
Landforms of Kumamoto Prefecture
Lists of volcanic eruptions
VEI-7 volcanoes
Volcanoes of Kyushu